The EMD G12 is a class of export locomotive built by GM-EMD, and its Canadian affiliate General Motors Diesel. In addition, Australian licensee Clyde Engineering built ten locomotives for New Zealand in 1957, five for Hong Kong, 23 for Queensland, fourteen for Western Australia and seven for BHP. Australian licensee Commonwealth Engineering also built 42 for Queensland Rail in 1964–66. Many examples were built in the 1950-1960s for railroads around the world.

The A1A-A1A version had a lower axle loading than the Bo-Bo version.

Original Owners

Bo-Bo version

Australia
 7 BHP Whyalla DE class

Brazil
A total of 241 locomotives:
 2 Estrada de Ferro de Goiás 5201–5202
 30 Mogiana Railway 3001–3030
 43 Estrada de Ferro Noroeste do Brasil 1101–1143
 17 Rede de Viação Paraná-Santa Catarina
 18 São Paulo Railway 700–717
 25 Rede Mineira de Viação 2201–2207, 2217–2228
 71 Viação Férrea do Rio Grande do Sul 2121–2145, 2161–2168, 6169–6206
 35 Estrada de Ferro Vitória a Minas 531–565

Canada
 2 London & Port Stanley Railway L4, L5
 1 General Motors Diesel demonstrator 7707 (to Sweden as Statens Järnvägar T42 in service between 1956 and 1983 preserved by the Swedish State Railroad Museum and is still in running order.)

Chile
 3 Andes Copper Mining 81–83, currently on service by Ferronor.

Egypt
 97 Egyptian Railways 3701–3797. During the 1967 Six-Day War, Israel captured 3712, 3715, 3766 and 3795, which were appropriated to Israel Railways stock.

Israel
 23 Israel Railways 104–126, some since rebuilt with 12-645E engines. After the 1967 Six-Day War, four captured Egyptian G12s were renumbered 127–130.

Iran 
 137 Islamic Republic of Iran Railways 40.01–40.137
 Driver cab of most of the active units have been changed to full view like GT26.
 Railway Research Center (MATRAI) has converted one of G12 loco to Hybrid locomotive in 2001 with AC drive.

Hong Kong
 5 Kowloon-Canton Railway Corporation No. 51–55
 52–55 re-sold to Chicago Freight Car Leasing Australia as TL152–TL155
 51 Sir Alexander, named after by-then governor of Hong Kong in 1955, Alexander Grantham, was donated and preserved in Hong Kong Railway Museum after retirement and restoration

Mexico
 84 Ferrocarriles Nacionales de México 5806–5889

Netherlands
 5 Dutch State Mines SM 151-155 (Built in 1956-1959 under license as Henschel G12 in Germany). In 1970 sold to the Nederlandse Spoorwegen as series NS 2901-2905. In 1975 sold to Ferrocarriles de Vía Estrecha in Spain.

South Korea
 25 Korean National Railways 4001–4015(From 4011 to 4015, the gear ratio was changed to change the speed to reach , and the numbers were revised to 4301 to 4305)  , 4101–4110

Nigeria
 25 Nigerian Railways 1101–1125

Norway
 2 Sydvaranger 1, DE101 – G12 (used on the Kirkenes–Bjørnevatn Line, 1954–97)

Sri Lanka
 2 Sri Lanka Railways Class M2C 626–627 (Before 2010 it used only for upcountry between Rathmalana, Colombo- Kandy, Badulla.)

Sweden
 1 locomotive bought by SJ in 1956, named at first T5, later T42. It was built by GM for sales demo in Europe, and SJ bought it afterwards. Now placed at the Swedish Railway Museum.

Venezuela
 Government Coal Mines 01–03

A1A-A1A version

Argentina
 25 Sarmiento Railway 4501–4525, later 6551-6575.

Australia
 13 Queensland Rail 1400 class

Brazil
A total of 26 locomotives:
 6 Rede Mineira de Viação 2708–2712
 20 Viação Férrea do Rio Grande do Sul 2101–2120

Indonesia
 11 Indonesian State Railways BB201 01–BB201 11

Mexico
 6 Ferrocarriles Nacionales de México 5800–5805

New Zealand
 146 New Zealand DA class locomotive 1400–1545

Sri Lanka

12 Sri Lanka Railways. All except M2 571 still in daily operation (1). Classified as Class M2
 Class M2 569–573 And one locomotive (M2 571) destroyed by terrorism.
 Class M2A 591–593
 Class M2B 594–595
 Class M2D 628–629

Taiwan
 52 Taiwan Railway Administration R21–R72; some of their engines were replaced to 12-645E. R56–59: sent to Malawi Railways in July 2006.

United States
 1 Electro-Motive Division demonstrator 1956

Co-Co version

Argentina

 60 Sarmiento Railway as model GR12, initially 6576-6635 but later some were renumbered.

Australia
A total of 66 locomotives:
 10  Queensland Rail 1450 class
 42  Queensland Rail 1460 class (later on-sold to Tranz Rail and converted to DQ class locomotives for use in New Zealand and Tasmania).
 14 Western Australian Government Railways A class

Preservation
Both engines worked for construction of KTX Gyeongbu section as departmental vehicles upon retirement of KORAIL.

Gallery

See also 
List of GM-EMD locomotives
List of GMD Locomotives

References

External links 

 Unofficial EMD Homepage G12 orders
 

G12
G12
Clyde Engineering locomotives
T42
A1A-A1A locomotives
Bo-Bo locomotives
Co-Co locomotives
Diesel-electric locomotives of Argentina
Diesel-electric locomotives of Brazil
Diesel-electric locomotives of Canada
Diesel-electric locomotives of Chile
Diesel-electric locomotives of Egypt
Diesel-electric locomotives of Indonesia
Diesel-electric locomotives of Israel
Diesel-electric locomotives of Iran
Diesel-electric locomotives of Hong Kong
Diesel-electric locomotives of Mexico
Diesel-electric locomotives of South Korea
Diesel-electric locomotives of Nigeria
Diesel-electric locomotives of Norway
Diesel-electric locomotives of Sri Lanka
Diesel-electric locomotives of Sweden
Diesel-electric locomotives of Taiwan
Diesel-electric locomotives of Venezuela
Six-Day War
Metre gauge diesel locomotives
3 ft 6 in gauge locomotives
Standard gauge railway locomotives
5 ft 6 in gauge locomotives
Year of introduction missing